King prawn may refer to:
 In Australia, several species of commercially significant edible prawns (shrimp) in the genus Melicertus (previously classified in Peneaus): 
 Melicertus plebejus (Hess, 1865) - eastern king prawn;
 Melicertus latisulcatus (Kishinouye, 1896) - western king prawn; 
 Melicertus longistylus (Kubo, 1943) - redspot king prawn.
 The vannamei prawn or whiteleg shrimp, Penaeus vannamei.
 Pepe the King Prawn, a Muppets character performed by Bill Barretta.
 King Prawn (band), an English ska punk band active 1993–2003 and 2012.
 Fairy King Prawn (靚蝦王), a racehorse.